North Creek is a census-designated place and hamlet in the Adirondack Park, in the town of Johnsburg, in Warren County, New York, United States. It is an area known for skiing (Gore Mountain), hiking and other outdoor recreational activities.

The town hall, library, and Johnsburg Central School are all located in North Creek. The Saratoga and North Creek Railroad was a heritage railway that operated between North Creek and Saratoga Springs over the tracks of the historic Adirondack Railway. The North Creek Depot Museum is in the town, documenting the cultural and industrial history of the Adirondacks area.

Demographics

History
North Creek was the original northern terminus of the Adirondack Railway, the first railroad into the Adirondacks, built by Dr. Thomas C. Durant.  It was to the station at North Creek that then Vice President Theodore Roosevelt rode from Mount Marcy upon learning of the death of William McKinley in 1901.

The North Creek Railroad Station Complex was listed on the National Register of Historic Places in 1976.

Business and tourism

The Gore Mountain ski area has been expanded greatly over the past five years, with new trails, gondola, and quad chairlift, which has increased trails by 40%.  The center is owned by New York State and operated by ORDA (Olympic Regional Development Authority).  As a result, the hamlet of North Creek has seen an influx of private investment in new businesses, including a bakery/coffeehouse "Cafe Sarah", the Alpine Lodge, the locally known, high-end chocolate company "Barkeater Chocolates", and the Tannery Pond Community Center, which is home to many non-profit organizations, an art gallery, Art & Nature Camp, and a theater company.

References

External links
 North Creek Depot Museum

Hamlets in New York (state)
Census-designated places in Warren County, New York
Census-designated places in New York (state)
Hamlets in Warren County, New York
New York (state) populated places on the Hudson River